Hermetia hunteri is a species of soldier fly in the family Stratiomyidae.

Distribution
United States, Mexico.

References

Stratiomyidae
Insects described in 1909
Taxa named by Daniel William Coquillett
Diptera of North America